Andrew Gooding (born 31 January 1964) is a Jamaican sailor. He competed at the 1992 Summer Olympics, the 1996 Summer Olympics, and the 2000 Summer Olympics.

References

External links
 

1964 births
Living people
Jamaican male sailors (sport)
Olympic sailors of Jamaica
Sailors at the 1992 Summer Olympics – 470
Sailors at the 1996 Summer Olympics – 470
Sailors at the 2000 Summer Olympics – 470
Place of birth missing (living people)